Bastilla angularis is a moth of the family Noctuidae first described by Jean Baptiste Boisduval in 1833. It has an Oriental and Panafrican distribution. India (Bihar & Jharkhand), it is found in Eswatini, Gabon, Cabo Verde, São Tomé, Réunion and Madagascar.

The adults have a wingspan of about 40 mm. The larvae feed on Phyllanthus species.

References

External links
Holloway, J. D. & Miller, Scott E. (2003). "The composition, generic placement and host-plant relationships of the joviana-group in the Parallelia generic complex". Invertebrate Systematics. 17: 111–128.

Bastilla (moth)
Moths described in 1833
Moths of Africa
Moths of Cape Verde
Moths of the Comoros
Moths of Madagascar
Moths of Mauritius
Moths of the Middle East
Moths of Réunion
Moths of São Tomé and Príncipe
Moths of Seychelles